Spanish might refer to:
 Items from or related to Spain:
Spaniards are a nation and ethnic group indigenous to Spain
Spanish language, spoken in Spain and many Latin American countries
Spanish cuisine

Other places
 Spanish, Ontario, Canada
 Spanish River (disambiguation), the name of several rivers
 Spanish Town, Jamaica

Other uses
 John J. Spanish (1922–2019), American politician
 "Spanish" (song), a single by Craig David, 2003

See also
 
 
 Español (disambiguation)
 Spain (disambiguation)
 España (disambiguation)
 Espanola (disambiguation)
 Hispania, the Roman and Greek name for the Iberian Peninsula
 Hispanic, the people, nations, and cultures that have a historical link to Spain
 Hispanic (disambiguation)
 Hispanism
 Spain (disambiguation)
 National and regional identity in Spain
 Culture of Spain
 Spanish Fort (disambiguation)

Language and nationality disambiguation pages